Fort Sask Transit (FST) is a public transit service in the city of Fort Saskatchewan, Alberta. It operates two routes within the city, and a third route is contracted to Edmonton Transit Service (ETS) to connect with its service network.

History 
Prior to the introduction of a local transit service, the Edmonton Transit Service (ETS) operated a commuter route between Fort Saskatchewan and Edmonton's Clareview Transit Centre. The commuter route 198 (known as 580 since 2022), was launched in 2004. Mid-day service was cancelled in 2005 due to low demand, and this route was only operated during peak hours. Fort Sask Transit (FST) was launched as a pilot program on April 26, 2014. It consisted of two routes, which provided coverage to most of the city's residential and commercial areas. Operation of the buses was contracted to local company Fort Taxi and Buslines. The buses were free to ride for their first five days of operation; fares were introduced on May 1, 2014.

The pilot program was deemed a success, and a full transit service was formally introduced in September 2016. The city purchased three new buses, and the contract to operate these city-owned transit buses was given to PWTransit Canada. Ridership has increased significantly since FST's full launch; FST reported that more than 7,300 trips were taken on its local routes in October 2018, which represented a 69% increase from the same time-frame in 2017. Students, new residents, and people with limited mobility represented some of the demographics that saw increased usage.

The U-Pass system, which allows students to pay a flat fee in their tuition for access to regional transit services, was expanded to Fort Saskatchewan in September 2017. In May 2018, Fort Saskatchewan opened a new $3.4 million park-and-ride facility near the Dow Centennial Centre (DCC). The facility has 300 parking stalls and a capacity of 50 people, as well as a heated shelter and bicycle parking. Solar panels and recycled asphalt were incorporated to make the structure more environmentally friendly.

In April 2019, Fort Saskatchewan city council approved the purchase of an electric bus for $397,500, with the city contributing $70,000 of the total cost, and the rest of the cost being covered by provincial and federal grants. This purchase was later cancelled by city council due to the closure of the Alberta Community Transit Fund, which would have provided the provincial contribution for the purchase. In November 2019, mid-day service was re-instated for the ETS commuter route, which had been re-numbered to 580. The size of the ETS bus serving route 580 was cut back in that same period, with a 30-foot Grande West Vicinity Bus replacing the previously used 40-foot New Flyer bus. 

FST launched a semi-weekly route tailored to the city's senior population in March 2019, at a cost of $35,000 per year. It provided seniors with access to downtown, shopping centres, and medical services. Throughout the COVID-19 pandemic, the route averaged one rider, or less, per hour. City council voted in late August 2020 to cancel the route as of September 18, 2020, with Mayor Gale Katchur noting that this decision could be revisited as the pandemic eased.

Routes 

FST operates two bus routes within Fort Saskatchewan from Monday to Friday. The two daily routes, 582 (the "Blue Route"), and 583 (the "Red Route"), mostly traverse the same parts of the city, but go in opposite directions. The two routes diverge at the east and west ends of the city, with the Westpark neighbourhood being served mostly by route 582, and the downtown core conversely being served mainly by route 583. FST provides real-time tracking for both local routes using the third-party app Passio GO. 

To help facilitate regional travel, ETS is contracted by Fort Saskatchewan to operate route 580, which provides peak-hour service between Fort Saskatchewan and the Clareview Transit Centre in Edmonton. Both local routes, as well as route 580, converge at the FST park and ride, and at the North Transfer Station on 99th Ave.

Special Transportation Services Society 
The Special Transportation Services Society (STSS) is a volunteer service operated by the Fort Saskatchewan Lions Club, which offers accessible minivan services for people who use walkers, wheelchairs, mobility scooters, or are otherwise unable to access regular transit services due to a physical disability. People who use this service must register in advance, and bring a companion who can look after them during the trip. The group offers service to anywhere within Fort Saskatchewan for $5 per one-way trip. They also offer rides to medical services in select neighbouring communities, but the cost of the trip is dependent on the distance traveled. Local service operates Monday to Friday, while out-of-town service is only available from Tuesday to Thursday.

Fares

General 
The table below lists general fares as of 1 January 2021. FST currently only accepts cash for fare payments made on buses.

Children 12 and under ride for free as long as they are accompanied by a fare-paying passenger.

FST provides discounts for certain groups:

 Low-income riders qualify for discounted monthly rates through the "Everyone Rides" program.
 Students attending MacEwan University, NAIT, NorQuest College, and the University of Alberta have access to the Universal Transit Pass (U-Pass) program, which offers unlimited rides in exchange for a fee built into their tuition.

Commuter 
FST contracts Edmonton Transit Service (ETS) to provide a connection to the Clareview Transit Centre in Edmonton. The fares for this connecting route, #580, are set by ETS.

FST also offers an integrated monthly pass which allows for unlimited travel locally and within Edmonton. This pass costs $126.00 for students age 13–17, $180.00 for adults 18–64, and $53.00 for seniors 65+.

Facilities

DCC Park and Ride 
Address: Fort Saskatchewan, AB T8L 0G7

Coordinates: 

Amenities: Park and ride, heated shelter, bicycle parking

North Transfer Station 
Address: 95 Street & 99 Avenue, Fort Saskatchewan, AB

Coordinates: 

Amenities: Heated shelters

PWTransit Bus Garage 
Address: #105 – 11129 83 Avenue, Fort Saskatchewan, Alberta T8L 3T9

Coordinates: 

Functions: Storage and maintenance facility for buses; no transit services are provided from this location.

Fleet

*Companions of passengers with mobility aids and equipment may ride for free.

Route 580 is served by a 30-foot Grande West Vicinity Bus, which is owned and operated by ETS, and fully accessible.

Plans

Arc card 

FST joined the SmartFare program, which comprises an electronic fare card and intermunicipal fare structure, in May 2018. It allows riders to pay their fares by tapping fare cards when boarding and leaving buses, and riders will eventually be able to pay by tapping their bank cards. Edmonton, St. Albert, and Strathcona County are among the other communities which participate in this system. This new system was set to launch in early 2021, but its rollout was delayed by the closure of the Canada-United States border during the COVID-19 pandemic. 

On 8 June 2021, it was announced that the SmartFare payment system will be branded as Arc. UPass users became the first users of Arc cards in fall 2021, when postsecondary institutions began Arc card distribution. A pilot test began on January 1, 2022, and includes 500 adult fare riders. The results from this pilot were reviewed in March 2022, but Arc was not rolled out to the public at that time. Arc launched for adult fare-paying riders on November 21, 2022, but Fort Sask Transit's local service won't accept Arc cards until 2023. The final portion of the launch will commence in 2023, and expand Arc eligibility to seniors, youth, junior high and senior high school students, customers who purchase low-income passes, DATS riders, and users of regional paratransit services.

A fare vending machine which sells Arc cards and Arc tickets is located at the Dow Centennial Centre, and more fare vending machines are located major locations in the region, including all Edmonton LRT stations and the Edmonton International Airport. The machines accept cash, debit, and credit cards, and riders can also add money to their account balances online. Each rider's balance is stored on their account, rather than on the Arc cards or Arc tickets themselves. Arc cards feature monthly fare-capping; frequent riders who reach a fare threshold will ride for the remainder of that period for free of charge. Arc tickets work similarly to Arc cards, but are one-time use only.

Edmonton Metropolitan Transit Services Commission 

In March 2020, Fort Saskatchewan city council voted to join twelve other municipalities to investigate the potential for a regional transit services commission. Its membership in the potential commission was subject to another vote once its cost model was altered to reflect Strathcona County's decision to opt out. The potential commission would allow for weekend transit service in Fort Saskatchewan, and add bus services to the Northern Alberta Institute of Technology (NAIT), and West Edmonton Mall. In June 2020, Fort Saskatchewan and eight other regional municipalities, including Edmonton, Leduc, Spruce Grove, and St. Albert, formally submitted an application to the provincial government to establish the Edmonton Metropolitan Transit Services Commission (EMTSC). Their proposal had to be altered after three more municipalities, including Leduc County and Sturgeon County, withdrew from the project. Because Strathcona County opted out of the potential commission, Fort Saskatchewan plans to conduct separate talks with the county to try and establish a route between the city, and the county's Bethel Transit Centre. 

The formation of the EMTSC was approved by the Alberta government on 28 January, 2021. A board of elected representatives from each member community is conducting the initial setup of the commission, and working with the commission's inaugural CEO to develop its operational and planning capabilities. The EMTSC will begin service in early 2023. Edmonton's local transit services and LRT network will not be transferred to the commission at first, due to their size and operational costs. The commission's board will re-consider the inclusion of Edmonton's LRT network five years after the commission is formally stood up.

New fleet 
The city's 2022 capital budget allocates $660,000 toward the purchase of three new buses in 2022, to replace FST's current buses. This is because the current fleet is near the end of its lifespan, and maintenance costs are rising as a result. FST will work with the EMTSC to ensure that the new buses meet the EMTSC's needs when it takes ownership of them and launches its services.

See also 
Edmonton Metropolitan Transit Services Commission
Edmonton Transit Service (ETS)
Leduc Transit
St. Albert Transit
Strathcona County Transit

References

External links 
 Fort Sask Transit
 Edmonton Transit Service
 

Transit agencies in Alberta
Bus transport in Alberta
Fort Saskatchewan